The 2022–23 season is Oțelul Galați's first season back in the Liga II since the 2015-16 season. In addition to the Liga II, Oțelul will participate in this season's edition of Cupa României.

Overview

Oțelul ended the previous season by winning promotion to the Liga II in a final tournament, playing against Foresta and Dante Botoşani. Following the match 2nd leg win against Dante, the players went on holiday. The return to training took place in late June, with a friendly against Galați county Unirea Braniștea that took place on the 1st of July.

Players

Transfers

In

Out

Player statistics

Squad statistics

Start formations

Club

Coaching staff

Competitions

Overall

{|class="wikitable" style="text-align: center;"
|-
!
!Total
! Home
! Away
|-
|align=left| Games played || 24 || 13 || 11
|-
|align=left| Games won  || 11 || 8 || 3
|-
|align=left| Games drawn|| 8 || 3 || 5
|-
|align=left| Games lost || 5 || 2 || 3
|-
|align=left| Biggest win|| 3-0 vs. Metaloglobus || 3-0 vs. Metaloglobus || 3-1 vs. Dinamo
|-
|align=left| Biggest loss || 0-2 vs. Gloria || 0-2 vs. Gloria || 0-2 vs. Dej
|-
|align=left| Clean sheets || 10 || 7 || 3
|-
|align=left| Goals scored || 26 || 15 || 11
|-
|align=left| Goals conceded || 18 || 8 || 10
|-
|align=left| Goal difference || 8 || 7 || 1
|-
|-
|-
|align=left| Yellow cards || 49 || 28 || 21
|-
|align=left| Red cards || 1 || - || 1
|-
|align=left| Most appearances || colspan=3|  Laurențiu Maxim (21)
|-
|align=left| Most minutes played ||colspan=3|  Yabré (1800)
|-
|align=left| Top scorer     || colspan=3|  Cârjan (6)
|-
|align=left| Top assister   || colspan=3|  Cisotti (4)
|-
|align=left| Points         || 41/72 (%) || 27/39 (%) || 14/33 (%)
|-
|align=left| Winning rate   || % || % || %
|-

Liga II

League table

Results summary

Results by round

Points by opponent

Source: SCOG

Matches
Kickoff times are in EET.

Cupa României

Friendlies

References

See also
ASC Oțelul Galați
2022–23 Liga II
2022–23 Cupa României

2022-23
Otelul Galati season